The Platino Award for Best Ibero-American Picture (Spanish: Premio Platino a la mejor película iberoamericana) is one of the Platino Awards, Ibero-America's film awards. It was first given in 2014, with Sebastian Lelio's drama film Gloria being the inaugural winner. Spain holds the record of most nominations in the category with sixteen films nominated, at least one in every edition of the awards to date.

Two of the winners in the category have also won the Academy Award for Best International Feature Film (Roma and A Fantastic Woman), additionally, winners Wild Tales, Embrace of the Serpent, Pain and Glory and Argentina, 1985 were nominated for the same award.

In the list below the winner of the award for each year is shown first, followed by the other nominees.

Awards and nominations

2010s

2020s

Awards by nation

See also
 Goya Award for Best Iberoamerican Film
 Ariel Award for Best Ibero-American Film

References

External links
Official site

Film
Awards for best film